The Pacific Light Cable Network (PLCN) is a proposed cable system in the Pacific Ocean. Partners in the project include Meta Platforms (formerly known as Facebook) and Google.

landing points
Its landing points are planned to be:
 Baler, Philippines
 Toucheng, Taiwan
 El Segundo, California, in the United States
 Deep Water Bay, Hong Kong

Inactive
Although cable had already been laid, it was announced that the US FCC would not authorize connecting the PLCN to Hong Kong, for national security reasons.

References 

Submarine communications cables in the Pacific Ocean